Isaac Benzie was a department store located in Aberdeen, Scotland.

History
Isaac Benzie in 1894 opened a small drapery store at 185 George Street, Aberdeen after serving an apprenticeship in a general merchants shop in the village of Oyne. The business grew moving to bigger premises in Gallogate and further premises being opened selling additional goods across Aberdeen and a Hosiery factory in Concert Court.

In 1922, the business was incorporated  and in 1924 the stores were all brought together under one roof at 143-167 George Street. However Isaac Benzie died in 1926, with his sons Isaac Junior and Athol running the business.

In 1935 Isaac Junior died, leaving his brother to run the company, which he did until he retired in 1955. Upon his retirement he sold the business to House of Fraser, whom continued to trade under the Isaac Benzie name until 1972 when the business was transferred into the new Arnotts division and took the Arnotts name. The store continued to operate as an Arnotts until it was closed by House of Fraser in 1986.

References

Benzie Isaac
Defunct retail companies of the United Kingdom
Retail companies established in 1894
Benzie Isaac
1894 establishments in Scotland